Kenneth Westhues is a Canadian sociologist. He is a professor emeritus of Sociology at the University of Waterloo, where he was the chair of the department from 1975 to 1978. He is the author or editor of several books about workplace bullying in academia.

Early life
Westhues earned a PhD in Sociology from Vanderbilt University in 1970.

Career
Westhues was a professor of Sociology at the University of Guelph in 1971. He subsequently joined the Sociology at the University of Waterloo, where he was the department chair from 1975 to 1978.

Westhues initially published research about the relationship between church and state. He subsequently published research about the hippie movement. Westhues authored and edited several books about workplace bullying in academia. His research found that vulnerability was increased by personal differences such as being a foreigner or of a different sex; by working in a post-modern field such as music or literature; financial pressure; or having an aggressive superior. Other factors included envy, heresy and campus politics.

Selected works

References

External links
University of Waterloo: Kenneth Westhues homepage

Living people
Vanderbilt University alumni
Academic staff of the University of Guelph
Academic staff of the University of Waterloo
Canadian sociologists
Academics and writers on bullying
Workplace bullying
Year of birth missing (living people)